Anri Razanbeyevich Khagba (born 7 January 1992) is a Russian former professional football player.

Club career
He made his Russian Premier League debut for FC Rostov on 12 September 2010 in a game against Anzhi Makhachkala.

References

External links
 

Footballers from Abkhazia
Russian people of Abkhazian descent
1992 births
Sportspeople from Sochi
Living people
Russian footballers
Association football defenders
Russian Premier League players
FC Rostov players